Johan Heins (born 31 July 1947) is a Dutch equestrian. He competed in the team jumping event at the 1976 Summer Olympics.

References

1947 births
Living people
Dutch male equestrians
Olympic equestrians of the Netherlands
Equestrians at the 1976 Summer Olympics
Sportspeople from Drenthe